Raphael I of Constantinople (Rafaíl A΄,  / Rafailo I; ? – 1476) was Ecumenical Patriarch of Constantinople from 1475 to 1476.

Life
Raphael was a Serbian monk. He probably was chosen and supported as Patriarch by Mara Brankovic, the stepmother of Mehmed the Conqueror. Raphael was successfully appointed Patriarch in the first months of 1475, promising the Sultan a yearly payment of 2000 gold florins and a one-time gift of 700 gold florins.

The Greek community of Constantinople had not part in his appointment and fiercely opposed him. The Metropolitan of Heraclea, who traditionally enthroned the new patriarch, refused to consecrate him, and the liturgy was celebrated by the Metropolitan of Ancyra. For this reason he was not recognized as Patriarch by a large part of the Greek clergy.

In September 1475, he appointed Spyridon of Tver as new Eastern Orthodox Metropolitan of Kiev and all Rus'.

The sources show an extended bias against Raphael. He is accused of not speaking properly Greek and is denounced for his foreign accent and for his addiction to alcohol. It is reported that he was not able to stand during the ceremonies of the Great Friday because he was drunk.

Raphael reigned for about one year, until early 1476: at the beginning of the year, when he had to pay the annual gift he had promised to the Sultan, he tried to collect it from his faithful, who denied their help. Unable to pay the requested fee, he was immediately deposed and imprisoned. He died shortly after still in chains.

References

Sources

 
 
 
 
 
  

15th-century patriarchs of Constantinople
Eastern Orthodox Christians from Serbia
1476 deaths
Eastern Orthodox monks
Year of birth unknown
15th-century Serbian people
Medieval Serbian Orthodox clergy
Serbian monks